Ernest Julius Wilczynski (November 13, 1876 – September 14, 1932) was an American mathematician considered the founder of projective differential geometry.

Born in Hamburg, Germany, Wilczynski's family emigrated to America and settled in Chicago, Illinois when he was very young. He attended public school in the US but went to college in Germany and received his PhD from the University of Berlin in 1897.  He taught at the University of California until 1907, the University of Illinois from 1907 to 1910, and the University of Chicago from 1910 until illness forced his absence from the classroom in 1923. His doctoral students include Archibald Henderson, Ernest Preston Lane, Pauline Sperry, Ellis Stouffer, and Charles Thompson Sullivan.

Selected publications
 Projective differential geometry of curves and ruled surfaces, Leipzig, Teubner 1906
 Projective differential geometry of curved surfaces, Parts I–V, Transactions American Mathematical Society
 vol. 8, 1907, Part I, pp. 223–260
 vol. 9, 1908, Part II, pp. 79–120 ; Part III, pp. 293–315 
 vol. 10, 1909, Part IV, pp. 176–200 ; Part V, pp. 279–296

References

 "Ernest Julius Wilczynski." Dictionary of American Biography. New York: Charles Scribner's Sons, 1936. Gale Biography In Context. Web. 14 Feb. 2011.

External links 
 Ernest P. Lane (1934), "Biographical Memoir of Ernest Julius Wilczynski 1876-1932", National Academy of Sciences of the US Biographical Memoirs Vol XVI (PDF)
Guide to the Ernest J. Wilczynski Papers 1892-1931 at the University of Chicago Special Collections Research Center

1876 births
1932 deaths
Humboldt University of Berlin alumni
University of California faculty
University of Illinois faculty
University of Chicago faculty
19th-century American mathematicians
20th-century American mathematicians
Differential geometers
Emigrants from the German Empire to the United States